Giovanni Martusciello (born 19 August 1971) is an Italian association football coach and former player. He was most recently in charge as assistant manager at Juventus.

Playing career
An attacking midfielder, Martusciello started his career in his native island of Ischia, playing with then-Serie C1 club Ischia Isolaverde. He left his hometown club in 1995 to join Empoli, also in the Serie C1 league, being one of the protagonist of the club's two consecutive promotions up to the Serie A under young coach Luciano Spalletti. He made his top flight debut on 31 August 1997, in a game against Roma.

In 1999, he left Empoli to join Genoa, and then down to Serie C1 with Palermo in January 2000. He returned to play Serie B with Cittadella and Catania in the following three seasons before ending his career after minor league stints with Sambenedettese, Lucchese and Pontedera.

Coaching career
After his retirement as a footballer, Martusciello returned to Empoli, this time as a youth coach. He was then promoted as assistant under Alfredo Aglietti, then Maurizio Sarri and, lastly, Marco Giampaolo. In the summer of 2016, he was named new head coach of Empoli for the upcoming 2016–17 Serie A campaign, in what it was his first role as a head coach outright. He completed the season with Empoli relegated on the final matchday, which led to him leaving the club. He was successively appointed as technical collaborator of Luciano Spalletti at Inter Milan. Spalletti was relieved from his duty as Inter's head coach in June 2019 and subsequently, Mastusciello joined the staff of newly appointed Juventus head coach Maurizio Sarri as an assistant manager. For the first two matches of the 2019–20 season, Martusciello took the lead on the bench with Sarri out due to pneumonia.

References

Italian footballers
Serie A players
Serie B players
1971 births
Living people
Empoli F.C. players
Italian football managers
Serie A managers
Empoli F.C. managers
S.S. Ischia Isolaverde players
Association football midfielders